Microsoft Music Central is a discontinued music encyclopedia on CD-ROM produced by Microsoft, similar to their Cinemania product and part of the Microsoft Home range. The corpus includes a selection of biographical articles from the Guinness Encyclopedia of Popular Music a spin-off of the Encyclopedia of Popular Music written by Colin Larkin, album reviews from Q Magazine, and still images and full-motion video clips.  For a time, Microsoft made available monthly updates for those with Internet access.

The encyclopedia also allows browsing by artist, album, and genre, searching for particular keywords, and viewing portraits, album covers, song clips and video clips in the gallery.

Music Central includes informational 'tours' led by the recorded voice of an artist (or an imitation of their voice, in the case of Little Richard) on their own musical genre.  The tour directs the user to particular articles and media.

References
  [The title of this piece was corrected in a "For The Record" clarification on page 68 of the September 16, 1995 edition, explaining that the publisher of the CD-ROM was Microsoft and not "Macintosh"]

See also
 Microsoft Home
 Reference software

Music Central
Educational software for Windows